Leptolalax maculosus is a species of frogs in the family Megophryidae.

References

maculosus
Amphibians described in 2016